Ronald Bilius Weasley is a fictional character in J. K. Rowling's Harry Potter fantasy novel series. His first appearance was in the first book of the series, Harry Potter and the Philosopher's Stone, as the best friend of Harry Potter and Hermione Granger. He is a member of the Weasley family, a pure blood family that resides in "The Burrow" outside Ottery St. Catchpole. Being the only member of the three main characters raised in magical society, he also provides insight into the Wizarding World's magical customs and traditions. Along with Harry and Hermione, he is a member of Gryffindor house and is present for most of the action throughout the series.

Character development
According to Rowling, Ron was among the characters she created on the first day. Ron is inspired by Rowling's best friend Sean Harris (to whom Harry Potter and the Chamber of Secrets is dedicated), but she has clearly stated that she "never set out to describe Sean in Ron, but Ron has a Sean-ish turn of phrase." Like Harris is to Rowling, Ron is "always there" when Harry needs him. Ron fits many of the stereotypes expected of the sidekick; he is often used as comic relief, is loyal to the hero, and lacks much of the talent Harry possesses, at least, early on, in terms of magical power. However, he proves his bravery and magical ability several times, such as by playing 'real wizard's chess' in the first book, entering into the Forbidden Forest with Harry during the second book despite his arachnophobia, producing a full-corporeal Patronus Charm in the fifth book and even, in the seventh book, getting basilisk fangs from the Chamber of Secrets by mimicking Parseltongue without understanding it.

Some of Ron's qualities serve as foils to Harry's. Whereas Harry is an orphan with more gold than he needs, Ron comes from a loving but poor family. Many of his possessions are hand-me-downs. Harry is famous but would prefer to avoid the spotlight; Ron, in comparison, is often perceived as a mere lackey and sometimes becomes jealous of the recognition Harry receives. Overshadowed by his many siblings and the fame and achievements of his friends, Ron's inferiority complex and need to prove himself are the main thrusts of his character arc. As the books progress, he matures from an insecure boy to a competent young man capable of strategy and leadership.

Appearances

Harry Potter and the Philosopher's Stone

Rowling first introduces Ron with his family in Harry Potter and the Philosopher's Stone. Harry is lost at King's Cross railway station, and the Weasleys guide him through the barrier at Platform 9¾ into the wizarding world. Ron and Harry share a compartment on the Hogwarts Express, and they begin their friendship. Ron is fascinated with the famous Harry, and Harry is fascinated with the ordinary Ron. On the train, they both meet Hermione Granger as well, whom they initially dislike but who later becomes their close friend after they save each other during a dangerous encounter with a mountain troll. Ron and Harry share the same classes throughout the series and generally have similar academic successes and disappointments. Ron plays a vital part in the quest to save the Philosopher's Stone. His strategy at Wizard's Chess allows Hermione and Harry to proceed safely through a dangerous, life-sized animated chess game. During the game, Ron allows his piece to be sacrificed and is subsequently knocked unconscious. At the Leaving Feast, the last dinner of the school year, Albus Dumbledore, Hogwarts's Headmaster, awards Ron fifty House points to Gryffindor for "the best-played game of chess Hogwarts has seen in many years." These last-minute points help support Gryffindor's securing of the House Cup.

Harry Potter and the Chamber of Secrets
The second instalment, Harry Potter and the Chamber of Secrets, takes place the year following the events of the Philosopher's Stone.
During the summer, Ron attempts to write to Harry several times. He receives no reply because Dobby the house elf is stopping Harry's wizard mail. Ron becomes so concerned that he and his brothers Fred and George fly their father's enchanted Ford Anglia car to Harry's home at his aunt and uncle's house. Harry spends the next month at the Weasleys' home, The Burrow. While attempting to depart from King's Cross station, Harry and Ron find themselves unable to enter the barrier to access Platform 9¾. With Harry, Ron conceives the idea of taking the flying Ford Anglia to Hogwarts. The plan is successful, but the Anglia loses power at the end of the journey and crashes into the Whomping Willow. Ron and Harry survive the impact, but Ron's wand is broken in the process, and the car drives itself off into the Forbidden Forest, a forest at the edge of the Hogwarts grounds in which student access is prohibited. Ron receives a Howler from his mother, berating him for taking the car.

Later in the novel, Ron and Harry transform themselves using Polyjuice Potion to resemble Draco Malfoy's close associates Crabbe and Goyle, so that they can spy on him, and find out what he knows about the Chamber of Secrets. During the hunt to find the Heir of Slytherin, Ron is responsible for providing the first clue to the identity of Tom Marvolo Riddle, recalling that he saw the name "T. M. Riddle" on a trophy inscribed "For Special Services to the School". Later Ron is forced to come face-to-face with his worst nightmare, spiders, in the Forbidden Forest, where the two have ventured at Hagrid's suggestion. Giant spiders nearly devour the two of them, but the Weasley Ford Anglia returns from the Forbidden Forest and rescues the pair. Ron and Harry then discover the entrance into the Chamber, and enter it in the hopes of saving Ginny, Ron's sister, who had been kidnapped and kept in the Chamber. Due to an accident with Ron's wand, the Chamber Entrance's ceiling collapses, trapping Ron on one side and Harry on the other. Harry goes on to rescue Ginny and save the day. Ron and Harry are given Special Awards for Services to the School for this, and he receives two hundred points, along with Harry for their success in the Chamber of Secrets.

Harry Potter and the Prisoner of Azkaban

In Harry Potter and the Prisoner of Azkaban, Ron's rat, Scabbers, already seen in Philosopher's Stone, goes missing, for which he blames Hermione's new cat Crookshanks, and the two have a falling-out. They eventually make up when Hermione has a nervous breakdown brought by taking too many classes and distress at the fate of the hippogriff Buckbeak. The animal, owned by Hagrid, has been put on trial for injuring Draco and risks execution. Ron offers to help with the preparation of Buckbeak's defence, but this fails to help. Harry, Ron and Hermione go to see Hagrid on the day of the execution where they discover Scabbers hiding in Hagrid's hut. As they leave, Scabbers struggles free of Ron and runs away. He chases Scabbers to the Whomping Willow where he is grabbed by a large black dog and dragged into a tunnel hidden below the tree.

Harry and Hermione follow the tunnel, which leads to the Shrieking Shack. The dog is actually the animal form of Sirius Black (an Animagus), Harry's godfather and an escaped convict from the wizard prison Azkaban. The school's Defence Against the Dark Arts professor Remus Lupin arrives just after Harry and Hermione. Along with Sirius, Lupin casts a spell on Scabbers, who also turns out to be an Animagus by the name of Peter Pettigrew. Pettigrew was Sirius's, Lupin's, and Harry's father James Potter's school friend, thought to have been murdered by Sirius. Pettigrew, who had lived as a rat ever since faking his death, denies everything, but Sirius and Lupin piece together that he has been a servant of Voldemort, and it was he who divulged the secret whereabouts of Harry's parents, leading to their murder. Initially, Ron does not believe Sirius and refuses to turn over Scabbers to him, but he is disgusted when he learns his rat's identity. Pettigrew escapes when the main characters lead him out of the Whomping Willow. Ron, knocked out by a spell from Pettigrew, is taken to the hospital wing, and is forced to remain there while Harry and Hermione travel back in time to save Sirius and Buckbeak. At the end of the novel, Sirius sends Ron an excitable little owl whom Ginny names Pigwidgeon, but whom Ron refers to as "Pig".

Harry Potter and the Goblet of Fire
In Harry Potter and the Goblet of Fire, the Weasleys invite Harry and Hermione to the Quidditch World Cup. Ron is in awe of his favourite Quidditch champion, Viktor Krum. Ron is even more excited when Krum, still a student at the Durmstrang wizarding school, comes to Hogwarts to take part in the Triwizard Tournament, a magical wizarding tournament opposing the top three magic schools in Europe. However, when Harry, underage, mysteriously becomes the fourth Tournament champion, Ron joins the dissenters who think Harry somehow cheated his way into the tournament and feels let down; according to Hermione, this stems from Ron's latent envy caused by being left out of the spotlight shared by Harry or his brothers. The rift is serious enough that the friends fail to make up for nearly a month. They only reconcile shortly after Harry successfully gets by a fire-breathing dragon in the first task; Ron realises how dangerous the Tournament is and finally believes that Harry did not enter himself.

At Christmas time, as per Triwizard Tournament tradition, Hogwarts hosts a Yule Ball. Ron and Harry panic at the prospect of having to secure dates for the event, and Ron appalls Hermione with his immature approach, particularly for failing to extend her an invitation, apparently failing until the last minute to even realise she is a girl. At the last minute, Harry saves the day by getting Parvati Patil and her sister Padma to agree to come with the duo, although Padma seems less than pleased at Ron's surly attitude and shabby dress. Ron becomes overcome with jealousy when he sees Hermione with her date: his former idol Krum. When Hermione comes over to Ron and Harry for a friendly chat, Ron loses control and accuses her of "fraternising with the enemy" and giving away Harry's Triwizard secrets. At the evening's end, the two have a heated row, in which Hermione tells Ron he should have asked her before Krum, rather than simply hoping to secure her by default. Ron completely fails to get the hint and remains either in denial or oblivious to the pair's increasingly obvious feelings for each other. Ron's jealousy over Krum is mirrored by Hermione's dislike of Fleur Delacour (of the Beauxbatons Academy and a Triwizard competitor), on whom Ron has an obvious crush.

In the Second Task of the Tournament, Ron is the person selected for Harry to rescue from the depths of the Hogwarts Lake, as he is the one whom Harry would most miss. Harry successfully saves him and Ron mocks him gently for thinking that the hostages for the task were in actual danger.

Harry Potter and the Order of the Phoenix
In Harry Potter and the Order of the Phoenix, Ron is appointed a Gryffindor prefect, much to the surprise of himself and everyone else, especially Hermione, the other new prefect. His brother, Percy, now distant and disconnected from the family, sends Ron an owl congratulating him and advising him to "sever ties" with Harry and side himself instead with Professor Umbridge, the abominable new Defence Against the Dark Arts teacher at Hogwarts; the letter angers Ron. Ron explicitly shows his support and loyalty for Harry when his classmates imply Harry is lying about the return of Voldemort, sometimes using his power as prefect to threaten them into silence. Though they spend their usual amount of time bickering, Ron and Hermione present a united front endorsing Harry. Ron supports Hermione's suggestion of Harry teaching students practical Defence Against the Dark Arts, which Umbridge, using the Ministry of Magic to slowly take over the Dumbledore-run school, has all but banned. He co-founds the secret students' group called Dumbledore's Army. He also joins the Gryffindor Quidditch team as Keeper, but his nerves and confidence issues often get the better of him during practices and matches, causing the Slytherins to make up a song about how Ron will make sure Slytherin win the interhouse Quidditch Cup. However, during the last match, Ron plays better and wins the game and the Quidditch Cup for Gryffindor. At the climax of the novel, Ron battles the Death Eaters alongside Harry, Hermione, Ginny, Neville Longbottom and Luna Lovegood at the Department of Mysteries. He is injured in the fight, but makes a full recovery by the end of the novel.

Harry Potter and the Half-Blood Prince
In Harry Potter and the Half-Blood Prince Ron, who has grown taller over the summer, attracts the attention of Lavender Brown. Harry, the new Quidditch Captain, picks Ron to continue as Keeper for the Gryffindor Quidditch team, over competing candidate Cormac McLaggen who is equally-skilled but has difficulty with teamwork and following orders. Upon learning Hermione most likely had kissed Krum, Ron performs increasingly badly at Quidditch, and thrown off by jealousy of his former idol, becomes unkind to Hermione. His low self-esteem is not helped much by his younger sister Ginny who after Ron reacts badly to finding her kissing her boyfriend, throws in the fact that of those in the group, Ron is the only one who has never had his first kiss. To bolster Ron's confidence, Harry pretends to give him Felix Felicis, a potion which makes the drinker lucky; believing he has actually taken it, Ron performs admirably and Gryffindor wins the match. However, this leads to a major row between Ron and Hermione: Hermione accuses Harry of helping Ron cheat, while Ron berates Hermione for having no faith in his abilities. At a post-game celebration, Ron kisses Lavender (though Ginny describes it as "eating her face"). Hermione, jealous and seeking retaliation, takes McLaggen as her date to new Potions professor Horace Slughorn's Christmas party, but he proves to be an egomaniac. After Christmas, Hermione continues to ignore Ron, stopping only to give him disdainful looks and occasional snide remarks. By now, Ron is visibly discontent with his relationship with Lavender.

On his birthday in March, Ron accidentally eats Amortentia-infused Chocolate Cauldrons (actually meant for Harry). After being cured by Slughorn, he then consumes poisoned mead (which Draco Malfoy actually intended for Dumbledore). Harry saves his life by forcing a bezoar, a poison antidote, into his mouth, and Ron is transferred to the hospital wing. A panic-stricken Hermione arrives, forgetting her past anger. While sitting by his bed, Hermione, Harry, Ginny and the twins hear Ron mutter Hermione's name in his delirium, although they do not hear what he is saying and ignore it. Conversely, Ron feigns sleep when Lavender visits him. Upon recovering, Ron and Hermione reconcile, and a little while later, Ron and Lavender break up. Rowling in an interview said that she "really enjoyed writing the Ron/Lavender business, and the reason that was enjoyable was Ron up to this point has been quite immature compared to the other two, and he kind of needed to make himself worthy of Hermione....he had to grow up emotionally and now he's taken a big step up."

Initially, Ron does not support Harry's belief that Draco Malfoy is a Death Eater, a follower of Voldemort, but is later convinced. Before leaving Hogwarts with Dumbledore to recover a Horcrux Harry arranges for Ron, Hermione, and Ginny—together with any of Dumbledore's Army they can summon—to keep a close watch on Malfoy and Snape. Harry also provides them with the remains of his vial of Felix Felicis, to aid them in the effort. Despite the D.A.'s watch, Malfoy provides the Death Eaters entrance into Hogwarts, and a battle ensues. Thanks to Felix Felicis, Ron, Hermione and Ginny are unharmed by the Death Eater's hexes during the battle. Snape kills Dumbledore during the battle when Malfoy proves that he is unable to. During his funeral, Ron comforts a weeping Hermione. Ron and Hermione vow to help Harry find and destroy the Horcruxes and kill Voldemort, even if it means leaving Hogwarts.

Attention is drawn several times to Ron's deepening relationships to Harry and Hermione, with unresolved romantic tension with Hermione being one of the main subplots of the novel (and indeed, the entire series). Furthermore, Harry and Ron's friendship has strengthened to the point where Harry can tell Ron that his Quidditch performance is endangering his membership on the team without either character taking it personally.

Harry Potter and the Deathly Hallows
Ron agrees to go with Harry and Hermione on the quest to destroy all of Voldemort's Horcruxes. Worried that the Ministry, now taken over by Voldemort, will learn he is with Harry on a quest, Ron dresses the family ghoul up in pyjamas and spreads the story he is ill with "spattergroit", a type of highly contagious magical illness. Ron disguises himself as Reginald Cattermole as the trio attempts to find the locket Horcrux in the possession of Dolores Umbridge.

Harry decides he wants someone to wear the Horcrux at all times, fearing it might be lost or stolen. This has a much more profound effect on Ron than it seems to have on Hermione or Harry. Ron ends up lashing out in frustration at the lack of comforts and a concrete plan, eventually leaving his friends behind. Distressed over his absence, Harry and Hermione do not even mention his name during the time that he is gone. However, when they finally mention his name, Ron, who had immediately regretted his decision to leave but was captured by Snatchers and then could not return due to Hermione's anti-Death Eater enchantments, was led to Harry's location by unknown magic within the Deluminator he inherited from Dumbledore. Ron dramatically returns by saving Harry from drowning when Harry is attempting to recover Godric Gryffindor's sword from an icy pool. Harry, a sudden believer in the fate created by his return, immediately forgives Ron and insists it must be Ron who uses the sword to destroy Slytherin's locket. However, the portion of Voldemort's soul inside it plays on Ron's insecurities by revealing that Ron thinks he is "least loved by a mother who craved a daughter", then showing him a doppelgänger of Harry who tells him that Harry was happier without him and a doppelgänger of Hermione who does not return his affections and is involved instead with Harry. Ron summons his courage and overcomes the spell, destroying the locket, but is visibly shaken until Harry tells him that he regards Hermione as a sister and a friend, nothing more.

The trio are eventually captured by Snatchers, and Bellatrix Lestrange tortures Hermione with the Cruciatus Curse for information. This sends Ron into a panic, and he continually screams and fights with all his effort to save her, despite Harry's instruction that he calm down and think of a better plan. The trio and some other prisoners are rescued by Dobby, but the house-elf is killed by Bellatrix during the escape. Eventually, the trio returns to Hogwarts, hoping to find the last unknown Horcrux shown in Harry's vision. Having lost the Sword of Gryffindor to Griphook the goblin, Ron gets an idea to procure more Basilisk fangs and manages to speak enough Parseltongue to open the Chamber of Secrets, where Hermione destroys the Horcrux in Helga Hufflepuff's cup. He begins to worry about the fate of Hogwarts' elves. Upon hearing this, Hermione drops the basilisk fangs she was carrying and kisses him for the first time. He also takes part in the Battle of Hogwarts, witnessing the death of his brother Fred, and teams up with Neville to defeat Fenrir Greyback.

Epilogue
Nineteen years after Voldemort's downfall, Ron and Hermione have two children: Rose Granger-Weasley, whom they are sending off to her first year at Hogwarts, and a younger son named Hugo. Though the epilogue does not explicitly say Ron and Hermione are married, news articles and other sources treat it as a fact. Ron has also passed his Muggle driving test, despite Hermione's apparent belief that he could not do so without Confunding the examiner. (Ron secretly reveals to Harry he actually did Confund the examiner.) He and Harry work for the Ministry of Magic as Aurors, and along with Hermione they have helped to revamp the Ministry; it is far different from the one that existed previously. Before becoming an Auror, Ron joins George at Weasleys' Wizard Wheezes, which becomes a very lucrative business.

Characterisation

Outward appearance
Rowling introduces Ron as "tall, thin and gangling, with freckles, big hands and feet, and a long nose." Ron has the trademark red hair of the Weasleys and is indeed one of Harry's tallest schoolmates, even outgrowing some of his older brothers. Rowling states in the novels that Ron has freckles, though Rupert Grint, the actor who plays Ron, has none. Rowling has also stated that Ron has blue eyes.

Personality
Ron is known for his humour, loyalty, readiness to defend his friends and his love of food. Rowling in an interview described Ron as very funny but insensitive and immature, saying "There's a lot of immaturity about Ron, and that's where a lot of the humor comes from." As his first exercise with the actors who portray the central trio, Alfonso Cuarón, who directed the third film in the series, Prisoner of Azkaban, assigned them to write an autobiographical essay about their character, written in the first person, spanning birth to the discovery of the magical world, and including the character's emotional experience. Of Rupert Grint's essay, Cuarón recalls, "Rupert didn't deliver the essay. When I questioned why he didn't do it, he said, 'I'm Ron; Ron wouldn't do it.' So I said, 'Okay, you do understand your character.'" Commenting on Ron's character development in the final book, Rowling explained that "Ron is the most immature of the three main characters, but in part seven he grows up. He was never strong footed, people see him mostly as Harry's friend; his mother had actually wanted a girl and in the last book he finally has to acknowledge his weaknesses. But it's exactly that which makes Ron a man."

Magical abilities and skills
Ron is given his brother Charlie's old, chipped wand, which is made out of ash and has a unicorn hair sticking out of the end. He holds the wand together with Spellotape after nearly breaking it in half at the start of Chamber of Secrets, but it malfunctions dreadfully after this, backfiring spells, making strange noises, and emitting objects from the wrong end. Ron's new wand is fourteen inches, willow and unicorn hair, which he procures before the start of his third year at Hogwarts.  Ron's talents are rarely shown, but he, like the other DA members, survives a violent encounter with adult Death Eaters in Order of the Phoenix, and it is implied that during the Death Eater assault in Half-Blood Prince he held his own quite well because he was being helped by Felix Felicis, the good luck potion. In Deathly Hallows, Ron loses his original wand, and takes Peter Pettigrew's wand for his own. Following this, Ron begins to demonstrate more aptitude and general knowledge, along with a sudden spurt in maturity after a terrible row with Harry. For a while, he effectively leads the trio in the hunt for the Horcruxes while Harry suffers a major depression.

Rowling has stated that Ron's Patronus Charm takes the form of a Jack Russell Terrier, "a really sentimental choice" as Rowling herself owns a Jack Russell.

Family tree 

Ron was born into the Weasley family on 1 March 1980, the sixth of their seven children, and the youngest son. His middle name, Bilius, is the same as that of a deceased uncle. Ron grew up in the family home, The Burrow, near the village of Ottery St Catchpole in Devon. Ron has six siblings: his five older brothers, Bill, Charlie, Percy, twins Fred and George, and a younger sister, Ginny, each with their own distinct personality trait. Ron is often overshadowed by his siblings' accomplishments, but this is shown to be borne out of a lack of belief in himself, rather than a lack of actual talent or skill. Like his brothers, Percy and Bill he is made a Prefect. Like Fred, George and Ginny, he joins the Quidditch team and eventually grows to be an excellent Keeper.

The Weasley family is one of the few remaining pure-blood wizarding families, though they were considered "blood traitors" for associating with non-pure-bloods. Moreover, they are far from rich, and are looked down upon by snobbish "old families" such as the Malfoys. All of the Weasleys have been sorted into Gryffindor House at Hogwarts. All of the Weasley children, except Bill and Percy who both were Head Boy, are known to have played on the Gryffindor Quidditch team, with Charlie being the captain of the team for at least one of his school years. Bill, Charlie, and Ron were also chosen as the prefect of their House. The Weasleys also all work for the Order of the Phoenix, and all are members except for Ron, Percy, and Ginny, who (as of the end of Harry Potter and the Deathly Hallows) are not known to have officially been inducted into the Order. Arthur is distantly related to Sirius Black and is part of the famed Black family, though he and the rest of his immediate family have been considered "blood traitors" and are disowned. Other distant relatives include Draco Malfoy, Nymphadora Tonks, and Bellatrix Lestrange.

Reception
The character is highly popular. Ron was chosen by IGN as their third favourite Harry Potter character, who said that Ron's status as comic relief made him "instantly endearing" and that his frustration and flirtation with Hermione Granger was a "highlight". His friendship with Harry is listed as among the best portrayed in literature and film and his friends-to-lovers relationship with Hermione Granger is often referred to as a fan favorite and one of the best pairings in the series. However, many fans disapproved of the pairing, and Rowling herself has admitted in a 2014 interview that the relationship was "a form of wish fulfillment" and "that Hermione and Ron would probably need relationship counseling".

Portrayals

Film series 
Rupert Grint portrays Ron Weasley in all eight Harry Potter films. He auditioned after seeing a segment on the BBC children's news programme, Newsround, inviting children to send in information about themselves. Grint sent in a photo, a self-written script and a rap, documenting his desire to portray the character.

Rowling was supportive of the casting, calling Grint "perfect" for the role of Ron. Grint's portrayal of the character was critically acclaimed with him receiving a Satellite Award in the category of "Outstanding New Talent", and a Young Artist Award for "Most Promising Young Newcomer" for his performance in the first film. His performance has often been cited as the best of three main characters.

Theatre 
In 2016, British actor Paul Thornley played Ron Weasley in the original London cast of Harry Potter and the Cursed Child at the Palace Theatre, London in the West End. He was nominated for Best Supporting Actor in a Play at the 2017 Whatsonstage.com Awards. Thornley reprised his role as Ron Weasley on Broadway at the Lyric Theater in 2018.

In popular culture
Ron Weasley has made several appearances in parodies of Harry Potter and pop culture:

Seth Meyers appeared as Ron in Saturday Night Live in the sketch in which Lindsay Lohan portrays Hermione. 

On his The Big Impression show, Alistair McGowan did a sketch called "Louis Potter and the Philosopher's Scone". It featured impressions of Anne Robinson as Ron. 

In 2003, Comic Relief performed a spoof story called Harry Potter and the Secret Chamberpot of Azerbaijan, in which Jennifer Saunders appeared as both Ron and J. K. Rowling. 

In Harry Podder: Dude Where's My Wand?, a play by Desert Star Theater in Utah, written by sisters Laura J., Amy K. and Anna M. Lewis, Ron appears as "Ron Sneasley".

In the Harry Bladder sketches in All That, Ron appears as ReRon and is played by Bryan Hearne. 

Ron also is a regular character in Potter Puppet Pals sketches by Neil Cicierega. In one of the episodes, "The Mysterious Ticking Noise", Ron, along with Snape, Harry, Hermione and Dumbledore, is killed by a bomb placed by Voldemort; the episode being the seventeenth most viewed video of all time as of 2008 and the winner for "Best Comedy" of the year 2007 at YouTube. 

In the 2008 American comedy film Yes Man, Carl (portrayed by Jim Carrey) attends a Harry Potter-themed party hosted by Norman (Rhys Darby), in which Norman disguises as Ron. 

In A Very Potter Musical (2009) and A Very Potter Sequel (2010), parody musicals by StarKid Productions, Ron was portrayed by Joey Richter.

References

External links

 Ron Weasley at Harry Potter Lexicon

Harry Potter characters
Child characters in film
Child characters in literature
Child characters in musical theatre
Fictional British police officers
Literary characters introduced in 1997
Fictional child soldiers
Fictional members of secret societies
Fictional shopkeepers
Fictional war veterans
Film sidekicks
Male characters in film
Male characters in literature
Sidekicks in literature
Teenage characters in film
Teenage characters in literature
Teenage characters in musical theatre

de:Figuren der Harry-Potter-Romane#Ron Weasley